Karel Havlíček Borovský  is a 1925 Czechoslovak biographical film drama directed by Karel Lamač. It is about Karel Havlíček Borovský and is set during the 1848 revolutions.

Cast
Jan W. Speerger as Karel Havlíček Borovský
Anny Ondra as Fanny Weidenhofferová
Karel Lamač as Frantisek Havlíček 
Mary Jansová as Julie Sýkorová
Anna Opplová as Julie's Mother
Otto Zahrádka as Prince Windischgrätz
Robert Ford as Staff Officer
Rudolf Stahl as Staff Officer
Theodor Pištěk as Weidenhoffer / minister Augustin Bach
Max Körner as Newspaper publisher
Běla Horská as Princess Windischgrätz
Eduard Malý as Clerk
Jaroslav Vojta
Antonín Marek

References

External links
 

1925 films
1920s biographical drama films
Czechoslovak black-and-white films
Biographical films about writers
Biographical films about poets
Biographical films about journalists
Czech silent films
Films directed by Karel Lamač
Films set in 1848
Czechoslovak drama films
Cultural depictions of Czech men
Cultural depictions of writers
Cultural depictions of journalists
Cultural depictions of poets
1925 drama films
Silent drama films